Orwin Castel (born 18 June 1973) is a Mauritian footballer who plays as a goalkeeper for Langwarrin SC in Australia. He won 16 caps for the Mauritius national football team, and had spells with clubs in South Africa and Mozambique during his career. In 2013, he came out of retirement and signed a 1-year deal with Langwarrin SC of the Victorian State League Division 2, in order to help them in their bid for promotion. Unfortunately he didn't sport his trademark mullet in the later stages of his career, however he still had the fans out of their seats with a number of dramatic saves

External links

References

1973 births
Living people
Mauritian footballers
Mauritius international footballers
Mauritian expatriate footballers
Mauritian expatriate sportspeople in Australia
Manning Rangers F.C. players
Association football goalkeepers